Morning Departure (released as Operation Disaster in the United States) is a 1950 British naval drama film about life aboard a sunken submarine, directed by Roy Ward Baker, and starring John Mills and Richard Attenborough. It is based on a stage play of the same name by Kenneth Woollard, which had also been shown as a live TV play by the BBC both in 1946 and 1948. It was the feature film debut of Michael Caine.

Plot
The British submarine, HMS Trojan is out on a routine exercise to test its new snorkel mast. She encounters an unrecovered Second World War magnetic mine. When she dives the mine is set off, and blows off the bows of the submarine. The after section floods from the displaced snorkel mast, killing the 53 crew-members in the bow and stern sections. She settles to the bottom leaving twelve crew members alive amidships, saved by the watertight doors which have been closed by order of the captain when he realises the imminent danger.

When the shore base becomes aware that Trojan is overdue, surface rescue vessels are sent out to investigate. The captain of the submarine, Lieutenant Commander Peter Armstrong (John Mills), sensibly provides an indication of their position to these vessels by expelling a quantity of oil which rises to the surface. Following standard escape procedure, a diver is sent down with an air line while everyone prepares for the rescue. Armstrong selects the first four for release; they escape safely without incident, and are picked up on the surface. The eight remaining crew assume there are plenty of breathing sets for them all to escape successfully. However, the captain discovers that all but four have been destroyed in the blast. This means the final four will have to remain under water until a full salvage operation can be carried out, which may take a week or more.

Armstrong assembles the others to draw lots through a pack of cards he deals out, to decide who goes and who remains. Two, the cook A/B Higgins (James Hayter) and the first lieutenant, Lieutenant Manson (Nigel Patrick), with the lowest cards, select themselves to stay behind along with Armstrong. The top three, to go first, also select themselves with high cards. Of the other two, there is a tie, both knaves, between Stoker Snipe (Richard Attenborough) and E.R.A. Marks (George Cole). On losing a re-deal, young Snipe goes berserk with fear and has to be physically restrained. Armstrong approaches Marks and asks if he will forfeit his place for Snipe, sensing difficulties if Snipe is left behind. Marks agrees.

They begin to prepare for escape, but Snipe now hangs back, falsely claiming he has hurt his arm in the scuffle. He insists that Marks should go. Marks and the other three escape safely through the hatch and are picked up by the salvage vessels. Below, Manson has a fainting fit, which he says is a result of having previously suffered from malaria, but Snipe catches him using both arms without difficulty. Cheerfully at first, the four begin the wait for the salvage operation.

Above, all goes well to begin with, in fine weather. Divers manage to secure cables under the submarine, which is slowly winched up, but only fifteen feet per day can be achieved. However, as the days go by, the weather turns, and soon there is a full storm at sea. As a result, the submarine shifts on the cables, and sinks again to the floor of the sea. Manson has remained in ill-health below, nursed with care by Snipe. However, chlorine begins to leak from a site next to his bunk. Manson is overcome by the gas, and dies.

The storm is so bad that the captain of the salvage ship decides his own men are at risk, and abandons the salvage operation altogether. The three left in the submarine sense that there is no hope for them. The film ends with Armstrong reading from a naval prayer book.

From early scenes in the film, and from dialogue throughout, the viewer is given insights into the personal and home lives of the crew, their hopes, and their now thwarted ambitions. For example, Snipe is married to a wayward wife, whom he idolises; whilst Armstrong has been offered a lucrative shore job by his wealthy father-in-law, and had been planning to leave the Navy to take it up as soon as this patrol was over.

Cast

 John Mills as the captain, Lieutenant Commander Peter Armstrong
 Nigel Patrick as the first lieutenant, Lieutenant Manson
 Peter Hammond as Sub-Lieutenant Oakley
 Andrew Crawford as Sub-Lieutenant J. McFee
 Michael Brennan as Chief Petty Officer Barlow
 George Cole as Engine Room Artificer Marks
 Victor Maddern as Leading Telegraphist Hillbrook
 Roddy McMillan as Leading Seaman Andrews
 Frank Coburn as Leading Seaman Brough
 Jack Stewart as Leading Seaman Kelly
 James Hayter as Able Seaman Higgins
 Wylie Watson as Able Seaman Nobby Clark
 Richard Attenborough as Stoker Snipe
 George Thorpe as Captain Fenton
 Bernard Lee as Commander Gates
 Kenneth More as Lieutenant Commander James
 Alastair Hunter as Captain Jenner
 Helen Cherry as Helen Armstrong
 Lana Morris as Rose Snipe
 Zena Marshall as Wren
 Michael Caine as Teaboy (uncredited)

Original Play
The film is based on a stage play by Kenneth Wollard that was based on the loss of HMS Thetis (N25). The play was very popular at the time the film was made . Besides being presented on stage in several theatres in Britain, it had already been made as a live TV play by the BBC, first on 1 December 1946, with an afternoon rerun two days later, and was shown twice again by the BBC in February 1948 with a different cast. Nigel Patrick, who plays 1st Officer Manson in the film, played the captain in the first TV version.

In 1959 Dutch broadcaster NCRV also made a TV play from the stage play, titled S.14 vermist ("S.14 missing").

Production
In the play, the captain's name is Stanford, but for the film it was changed to Armstrong. Most other characters retained their names in the film version, although the film also has additional characters, due to the insertion of flashback scenes and scenes from the rescue operation on the surface. The stage play has an all-male fourteen-character cast, while the film has a credited cast of 20 (plus a few uncredited minor roles), which also includes three women.

Almost the entire budget was provided by the NFFC. It was shot at Denham Studios with sets designed by the art director Alex Vetchinsky.

 was used for the external submarine shots. The Maidstone was also used.

The role played by Nigel Patrick was originally offered to Peter Finch and James Donald but neither was available.

Truculent Incident
HMS Truculent sank in 1950, after an accidental collision with a freighter which resulted in the loss of 64 lives. The Truculent incident took place after filming of Morning Departure had been completed, but before it went on general release to the public. The producers decided to go ahead with the film release, as a tribute to the bravery of Royal Naval personnel.

Reception
Trade papers called the film a "notable box office attraction" in British cinemas in 1950. According to Kinematograph Weekly the 'biggest winners' at the box office in 1950 Britain were The Blue Lamp, The Happiest Days of Your Life, Annie Get Your Gun, The Wooden Horse, Treasure Island and Odette, with "runners up" being Stage Fright, White Heat, They Were Not Divided, Trio, Morning Departure, Destination Moon, Sands of Iwo Jima, Little Women, The Forsythe Saga, Father of the Bride, Neptune's Daughter, The Dancing Years, The Red Light, Rogues of Sherwood Forest, Fancy Pants, Copper Canyon, State Secret, The Cure for Love, My Foolish Heart, Stromboli, Cheaper by the Dozen, Pinky, Three Came Home, Broken Arrow and Black Rose.

Roy Ward Baker said "I was very proud of that film and still am. It was an immense success in its day and that's how I came to go to Hollywood in 1952, because the Americans had seen that film."

References

External links
 
 
 
 New York Times review of "Operation Disaster" January 15, 1951 Retrieved 2012-11-24

1950 films
Films shot in Buckinghamshire
Films directed by Roy Ward Baker
Submarine films
British films based on plays
Films scored by William Alwyn
British war drama films
1950s war drama films
British black-and-white films
Films shot at Denham Film Studios
1950s English-language films
1950s British films